Roderigue Hortalez and Company was a corporation created by Luis de Unzaga as coordinator of interests of Spain and France in May of 1775 in order to provide arms and financial assistance to American Revolutionaries in anticipation of the American Revolutionary War against Britain. The ruse was organized by Pierre-Augustin Caron de Beaumarchais, a French playwright, watch-maker, inventor, musician, politician, fugitive, spy, publisher, arms-dealer, and revolutionary. Weapons and materials were procured to help the Americans fight the British, enemies of France at the time, through the corporation.

Background

The Seven Years' War had gone badly for France, which had lost nearly all of her North American colonial possessions and had been militarily humiliated by the British. Spain, who had been an ally of France late in the war, had lost the strategically important territory of Florida. Britain, meanwhile, had expanded its colonial territories across large areas of North America.

 
To get out of legal trouble Pierre Beaumarchais pledged his services to the king in order to restore his civil rights.

In 1774, Charles Gravier, Comte de Vergennes was appointed the foreign minister of France by Louis XVI. Vergennes was strongly anti-England, at one point declaring "England is the natural enemy of France." His chance to strike at Britain came through Pierre Beaumarchais.

The company in operation
Beaumarchais, working as a secret agent, had traveled to London in pursuit of Chevalier d'Eon, a cross-dressing agent of Louis XVI, who had threatened the King with blackmail. During that period Beaumarchais fell in with the dissolute crowd that surrounded John Wilkes, the Mayor of London. There he received a letter from the Continental Congress, delivered by Arthur Lee. In it Congress suggested to his government that it encourage the rebellion in the Thirteen Colonies by sending secret military aid disguised as a loan. Beaumarchais believed Britain's economy would be significantly crippled without the thirteen colonies. Louis XVI and Vergennes agreed.  Both states were unwilling to openly show their support, at least until after the rebellion had successfully begun.

Before the Declaration of Independence was even signed, weapons and other necessities were already flowing via the ostensibly neutral Dutch island of St. Eustatius. Muskets, cannons, cannonballs, gunpowder, bombs, mortars, tents, and enough clothing for 30,000 men were sent. This assistance kept American hopes alive during the spring of 1776.

Hortalez & Co. conducted business with the Americans from France through Connecticut merchant Silas Deane, who was sharing a covert trade agency with Thomas Morris the half-brother of Robert Morris (financier). Because this business did not include Arthur Lee, Lee then made it a point that Beaumarchais would never be paid for the goods he provided. He did this, not to harm Beaumarchais, but to deprive a political competitor his commission. As a result of Lee's actions, Deane lived in disgrace and poverty for years, and eventually died trying to prove that he was due the money.

Opposition
The only major opposition to the plan came from French minister of finance Baron Turgot. He insisted that American independence would occur whether or not France financed the rebellion. He said the funding would add to the already heavy burden of a general French military and naval buildup and would lead to bankruptcy. Turgot eventually resigned in protest.

References

Further reading
 Bass, Streeter. "Beaumarchais and the American Revolution." Studies in Intelligence 14 (1970): 1-1. [ online], CIA report
 Meng, John J. "A Footnote to Secret Aid in the American Revolution." American Historical Review (1938) 43#4 pp: 791-795. in JSTOR
 Morton, Brian N. "'Roderigue Hortalez' to the Secret Committee: An Unpublished French Policy Statement of 1777." French Review (1977): 875-890. in JSTOR
 Morton, Brian N. et Donald C. Spinelli, Beaumarchais Correspondances, tomes III et IV, Éditions A.-G. Nizet, Paris.
 de Langlais Tugdual, L'armateur préféré de Beaumarchais Jean Peltier Dudoyer, de Nantes à l'Isle de France, Éd. Coiffard, 2015, 340 p..
 Stillé, Charles J. "Beaumarchais and" The Lost Million"." The Pennsylvania Magazine of History and Biography  (1887) 11#1 pp: 1-36. in JSTOR
 York, Neil L. "Clandestine Aid and the American Revolutionary War Effort: A Re-Examination." Military Affairs: The Journal of Military History, Including Theory and Technology (1979): 26-30. in JSTOR

American Revolution
Manufacturing companies established in 1775
Weapons trade
France–United States relations